Charles Allen "Charlie" Berg (October 15, 1927 – January 22, 2014) was an American farmer and politician.

Born in Graceville, Minnesota, Berg went to the West Central School of Agriculture in Morris, Minnesota. Berg was a farmer and cattle breeder. He served on the Chokio, Minnesota School Board. Berger also served in the Minnesota State Senate from 1973 to 2002. At different times, he was a Democrat, Republican, and Independent. He died in Minneapolis, Minnesota.

Notes

1927 births
2014 deaths
People from Graceville, Minnesota
Farmers from Minnesota
School board members in Minnesota
Minnesota Independents
Minnesota Democrats
Minnesota Republicans
Minnesota state senators
People from Stevens County, Minnesota